Jurgen Belpaire (born 3 January 1973) is a retired Belgian football goalkeeper.

References

1973 births
Living people
Belgian footballers
Club Brugge KV players
RBC Roosendaal players
Association football goalkeepers
Belgium under-21 international footballers
Belgian expatriate footballers
Expatriate footballers in the Netherlands
Belgian expatriate sportspeople in the Netherlands
Belgian Pro League players
Eerste Divisie players